Nutepelmen (Chukchi: , Nutèpylmyn), is a village (selo) on the northern shores of Iultinsky District, Chukotka Autonomous Okrug, in the Far Eastern Federal District of Russia. The village is a traditional Chukchi and Yupik settlement in an area that has been inhabited for centuries. Whilst the village still exists, in 2010, a law was passed abolishing the municipal rural settlement of Nutepelmen, meaning that administration responsibilities passed to the central district administration.

Geography
The village, population 135, as of 2006:, is formed mainly of Chukchi people, and is located on a spit at the entrance to Pyngopylkhyn Lagoon (from the Chukchi, Pynopelgyn, lit. "sucking orifice").

Kolyuchin Island is found to the north east of the village.

History

Early history
Further along the coast, near the village, a stone circle can be found, dating from the sixteenth to seventeenth century when the Chukchi fought battles with the Cossack explorers. The skeletons of those killed in the battle can still be found on the surrounding tundra and the local Chukchi population regard the area as cursed. As well as the stone circle, on the eastern shore of Kolyuchinskaya Bay is the ancient Inuit village of Anayan (inhabitants transferred to Neshkan in the 1950s by Soviet authorities), where ruined houses still stand. the name of the village is derived from the Chukchi, meaning "Land in the Mist".

Recent history
On September 10, 2010, a law was passed abolishing Nutepelmen at municipal level. Nutepelmen as an entity continues to exist, but it is no longer a rural locality, this law stripped it of Selo status, it is simply an inhabited locality in the intra-settlement territory of Iultinsky municipal district. The right of the village to local government was removed and such responsibilities were taken over by Iultinsky municipal government on January 1, 2011. Iultinsky municipal government also took control of all municipal property, all municipal property rights and all local budgets on this date.

Climate
Nutepelmen has an arctic tundra climate (ET) with long, bitterly cold and snowy winters and very short, chilly and wet summers.

See also
List of inhabited localities in Iultinsky District

Notes

References

Sources
 

M Strogoff, P-C Brochet, and D. Auzias Petit Futé: Chukotka (2006). "Avant-Garde" Publishing House

External links
Nutepelmen photo gallery

Rural localities in Chukotka Autonomous Okrug
Populated places of Arctic Russia